This article lists notable underwater diver certification agencies. These include certification in cave diving, commercial diving, recreational diving, technical diving and freediving. Diver certification agencies are organisations which issue certification of competence in diving skills under their own name, and which train, assess, certify and register the instructors licensed to present courses following the standards for the certification they issue.

Recreational scuba diving certification agencies
Organisations which publish standards for competence in recreational scuba diving skills and knowledge, and issue certification for divers assessed as competent against these standards by affiliated schools or instructors:

ACDC -  CMAS code ITA/F07
ACUC -                                                                                  
AED -  CMAS code INT/F09
AFUS -  CMAS code ARM/F00
 CMAS code ITA/F14
AMCQ -  CMAS code CAN/F05
ANDI - , also ANDI International EUF CB 2005005
ANIS -  CMAS code ITA/F08
ANMP - 
APT -  CMAS code ITA/F05
 CMAS code ITA/F04
ASI -  CMAS code ITA/F11
AUF -  CMAS code AUS/F00
AUSI -  (formerly Australian Underwater Scuba Instructors)
BEFOS-FEBRAS -  (Royal Belgian Diving Federation) CMAS code BEL/F00
 CMAS code BLR/F00
BNAUA -  CMAS code BUL/F01
BSAC -  EUF CB 2007001
CBPDS -  CMAS code BRA/F00
CDP -  CMAS code CAN/F08
CFT -  (Irish Underwater Council) CMAS code IRL/F00
CFUA -  CMAS code CYP/F00
CIRSS -  CMAS code ITA/F01
CMAS -  
CMAS Baltic -  (Latvia) CMAS code LAT/F01
CMAS-CH -  CMAS code SUI/F01
CMAS-ISA -  CMAS code RSA/F01
CRASA -  CMAS code RUS/F00
CTUF -  CMAS code TPE/F01
CUA -  CMAS code CHN/F00
DDI -  EUF CB 2011003
DSF - 	Dansk Sports Dykker Forbund  CMAS code DEN/F00, EUF CB 2005006
EAVSL -  (Estonian Sportdivers Association) CMAS code EST/F00
ESA -  CMAS code ITA/F12
EOBV - 
EULF -  CMAS code EGY/F00
FAAS -  (Argentine Underwater Federation) CMAS code ARG/F00
FADAS -  CMAS code AND/F00
FASSAS - . CMAS code ALG/F00
FAS -  (Federation of Underwater Activities of the Republic of Moldava) CMAS code MDA/F02
FAST -  CMAS code TUN/F00
FAUI -  (formerly National Association of Scuba Diving Schools Australasia)
FCAS -  CMAS code CUB/F00
FCVDS -  CMAS code CPV/F00
FEDAS -  (Spain) CMAS code ESP/F00
FEDASUB -  CMAS code ECU/F00
FEDECAS -  CMAS code COL/F00
FEDEPASA -  CMAS code PER/F00
FEDESUB -  (Chile) CMAS code CHI/F00
FFESSM -  (French Underwater Federation) CMAS code FRA/F00
 CMAS code ITA/F10
FIAS -  CMAS code ITA/F09, EUF CB 2005004
Finnish Underwater Certification Kluster 
FIPSAS -  CMAS code ITA/F00
FLASSA -  CMAS code LUX/F00
FMAS -  (Monaco) CMAS code MON/F00
FMAS -  CMAS code MEX/F00
FMPAS -  (Moroccan Federation of Diving and Underwater Activities) CMAS code MAR/F00
FPAS -  (Portuguese Federation of Underwater Activities) CMAS code POR/F00
FSAS -  CMAS code SMR/F00
FSGT -
FUAM -  CMAS code MLT/F00
FVAS -  CMAS code VEN/F00
GUE -  EUF CB 2013001
HSA - 
HFUA -  (Hellenic Federation for Underwater Activities, Sportfishing and Finswimming) CMAS code GRE/F00
HKUAL -  CMAS code HKG/F00
HRS -  (Croatian Diving Federation) CMAS code CRO/F00
IAC -  EUF CB 2005001
IAHD -  EUF CB 2007005
IAHD Adriatic -  (International Association for Handicapped Divers Adriatic) CMAS code SLO/F01
IANTD -  CMAS code INT/F01
IDA 
IDEA - 
IPA -  (Monaco) CMAS code INT/F11
IDSA 
ISC - DiveISC International Scuba Certification ISO certified, HSE registered/>
ISDA -  EUF CB 2010002
ISE - 
 EUF CB 2006003
 CMAS code IRI/F00
ITDA - 
JCIA -  CMAS code JPN/F00
JCS - JCS CMAS code JPN/F03
JEFF -  CMAS code JPN/F02
KD Japan -  (Kansai Sports Diving Federation Japan) CMAS code JPN/F05
KDP PTTK -  (Polish Tourist Country-Lovers Society Underwater Activity Commission) CMAS code POL/F00
KP-LOK -  (Commission Diving National Defense League) CMAS code POL/F02
KSC -  CMAS code KUW/F02
KUA -  CMAS code KOR/F00
KUF -  CMAS code KGZ/F00
KWTDIVERS -  CMAS code KUW/F01
LDA -  (Ajamiaa Alibia Lil Gaus) CMAS code LBA/F00
LIB -  CMAS code LIB/F00
LTV -  (CMAS Liechtenstein) CMAS code LIE/F00
LUSF -  (Lithuanian Underwater Sport Federation) CMAS code LTU/F00
LZSF -  (Federation of Underwater Sports of Latvia) CMAS code LAT/F02
MBSz -  (Hungarian Divers Federation) CMAS code HUN/F00
MICRODIVE - 
MDEA - 
MSDA -  CMAS code MRI/F00
MSAC -  CMAS code MAS/F00
MTES -  diving division. CMAS code JPN/F04
MUF -  CMAS code MDV/F01
NADD -  CMAS code ITA/F03 EUF S 000513
NASE -  EUF CB 2008003
NASDS - 
NAUI - 
NDF -  (Norwegian Diving Federation) CMAS code NOR/F00
NDL -  EUF CB 2007003
NOB -  (Dutch Underwater Federation) CMAS code NED/F00
NUWF -  CMAS code NAM/F00
PADI -  EUF CB 2004001
PCIA -  (CMAS Philippines) CMAS code PHI/F01
PDA -  EUF CB 2006004
PDIC -  
PDSA - 
POSSIISSA -  (Indonesian Subaquatic Sport Association) CMAS code INA/F00
ProTec -  CMAS code INT/F08
PSAI -   
PSS - 
PTA -  CMAS code INT/F07
PTRD -  EUF S 000786
PURE APNEA 
PZPn -  (Polish Underwater Sports Federation) CMAS code POL/F01
 (Diving Association of Montenegro) CMAS code MNE/F00
RAID -  
RJMSF -  CMAS code JOR/F00
RUF -  CMAS code RUS/F01
 CMAS code KSA/F00
 (Diving association of Bosnia and Herzegovina) CMAS code BIH/F00
SAA -  CMAS code GBR/F03 
SEI -  USOA CMAS code USA/F00
SDFS -  CMAS code SEY/F00
SDI -  EUF CB 2006002
 CMAS code SRB/F00
SNSI -  
SPCR -  (Divers Association of the Czech Republic) CMAS code CZE/F00
SPZ -  (Slovenian Diving Federation) CMAS code SLO/F00
SSAC -
SSDF -  (Swedish Sports Diving Federation) CMAS code SWE/F00
SSI -  EUF CB 2005002
SUF -  CMAS code SIN/F00
 (Finnish Divers Federation) CMAS code FIN/F00
SUSV -  CMAS code SUI/F00
 CMAS code SYR/F00
 CMAS code TPE/F02
TDA -  CMAS code THA/F01
TIDF -  EUF CB 2012001
 CMAS code IMA/F00 (Marianas)
TSSF -  (Turkish Underwater Sports Federation) CMAS code TUR/F00
TVSÖ -  CMAS code AUT/F00
UEF -  (Hungary) CMAS code HUN/F01
UFUSUA -  CMAS code UKR/F00
UISP -  CMAS code ITA/F06
 CMAS code KAZ/F00
USOA -  CMAS code USA/F00
UTD -  
VDST -  CMAS code GER/F00, EUF CB 2004002
VDTL -  EUF CB 2009001
VIT - 
WADI- 
WOSD -  EUF CB 2011002
ZPS-SDA -  (Slovak Diving Union) CMAS code SVK/F00

Recreational certification organisations no longer operating
NASDS (USA) - National Association of Scuba Diving Schools only USA (Founded in the 1960s and merged with SSI in 1999)

TAC - The Aquatic Club - existed in the UK between 1982 and 1986. dissolved organization
 (1959-2008).

Technical diving certification agencies
Organisations which publish standards for competence in technical diving skills and knowledge, and issue certification for divers assessed as competent against these standards by affiliated schools or instructors:
 ANDI -  
 BSAC -  
 PADI TecRec (DSAT) -  
 GUE -  
 IANTD -  CMAS code INT/F01
 IART - 
 ISE - 
 NAUI Tec -  
 ProTec -  CMAS code INT/F08
 PSAI -  
 PSS Technical Division -  
 SAA -  CMAS code GBR/F03
 TDI -  EUF CB 2006002 CMAS code INT/F05 
 SSI TXR -   
 SwedTech Diving -  
 UTD -  
 NASE -  
 ITDA - 
 RAID - 
 ISSDA - 
 DIWA -

Cave diving certification agencies
Organisations which publish standards for competence in cave diving skills and knowledge, and issue certification for divers assessed as competent against these standards by affiliated schools or instructors:
ANDI - 
CDAA - 
CDG - 
GUE - 
IANTD -  CMAS code INT/F01 
ISE - 
 ITDA - 
NACD - 
NASE - 
NAUI Tec- 
NSS-CDS - 
ProTec - , Cave division. CMAS code INT/F08
PSAI -  
SCD -  
UTD -  
TDI -  CMAS code INT/F05
TSA - 
 RAID -

Freediving and snorkelling certification agencies
Organisations which publish standards for competence in freediving and snorkelling skills and knowledge, and issue certification for divers assessed as competent against these standards by affiliated schools or instructors:

 
AUF - 
CMAS -  
FII -  
IANTD - 
Molchanovs Freediving Education
PFI -   
PADI  
Pure Apnea - Specialising in both sports and recreational freediving. Currently the only freedive education system separating competitive from recreational freediving (www.pureapnea.com)
ProTec - , Apnoea division CMAS code INT/F08
 

ISC - DiveISC

Commercial diver training and registration authorities
Organisations which publish standards for competence in commercial diving skills and knowledge, and issue certification for divers assessed as competent against these standards by registered or affiliated schools:
ADCI – Association of Diving Contractors International 
ACDE – 
ADAS – 

DCBC – 
HSE –  
 ITDA - 

 (Workers Compensation Board British Columbia)
(SA)DEL – 
Sicilian online repertory of commercial divers – Department of Employment and Labour of Sicilian regional government (Regione siciliana) keeps an online repertory of commercial divers trained according IDSA standards
Organisations specifically certifying public safety divers:
DRI - 
 ERDI -

Scientific diving certification agencies
Organisations which publish standards for competence in scientific diving skills and knowledge, and issue certification for divers assessed as competent against these standards by affiliated schools or instructors:
 AAUS - American Academy of Underwater Sciences 
 CAUS - Canadian Association for Underwater Science 
 The Scientific Committee of CMAS 
DIA - Dive International Agency
 SDSC - Scientific Diving Supervisory Committee
 ITDA - International Technical Diving Agency

Other certification agencies for skills associated with diving

Dedicated diver first aid & rescue training
 DAN - Divers Alert Network
 ILS - International Life Saving Federation
 IHMP - IHMP First Aid and Medical Training

Maritime archaeology
 NAS - Nautical Archaeology Society

Professional associations for diving instructors
ANMP - Association nationale des moniteurs de plongée (France) 
CEDIP - European Committee of Professional Diving Instructors (Comité Européen Des Instructeurs de Plongée professionnels)

International standards, accreditation and quality assurance organisations
CMAS - Confédération Mondiale des Activités Subaquatiques 
EUF - European Underwater Federation
IDSA – International Diving Schools Association  
IDSSC - International Diving Safety Standards Commission 
IMCA – International Marine Contractors Association 
 RTC - Rebreather Training Council
WRSTC - World Recreational Scuba Training Council

References

External links

Lists of sports organizations

fr:Liste des associations et fédérations de plongée